Rothchild is a 1934 French comedy film directed by Marco de Gastyne and starring Harry Baur, Fred Pasquali and Paul Pauley. It was remade as a 1935 British film The Guv'nor starring George Arliss.

The film's sets were designed by the art director Guy de Gastyne.

Synopsis
Rothchild, a tramp, is assumed by a number of people to be a member of the famous banking family because of his surname.

Cast
 Harry Baur as Rothchild
 Fred Pasquali as Flip
 Claudie Clèves as Madeleine
 Paul Pauley as Barsac
 Christian Casadesus as Marcel
 Germaine Michel as Mademoiselle Fallot
 Germaine Auger as Gaby Barsac
 Philippe Hériat as Diégo
 Georges Paulais as Marty
 Pierre Piérade as Fil de Fer
 Jean d'Yd as Le professeur

References

Bibliography 
 Cook, Pam. Gainsborough Pictures. Cassell, 1997.
 Fujiwara, Chris. Jacques Tourneur: The Cinema of Nightfall. McFarland, 1998.

External links 
 

1934 films
1934 comedy films
French comedy films
1930s French-language films
Films directed by Marco de Gastyne
Films set in Paris
1930s French films